The 1880 United States presidential election in Louisiana took place on November 2, 1880, as part of the 1880 United States presidential election. Voters chose eight representatives, or electors to the Electoral College, who voted for president and vice president.

Louisiana voted for the Democratic nominee, Winfield Scott Hancock, over the Republican nominee, James A. Garfield. Hancock won the state by a margin of 24.96%.

Results

See also
 United States presidential elections in Louisiana

References

Louisiana
1880
1880 Louisiana elections